Philipp Wilhelm Grimm (died 1796) was a German lawyer and father to the Brothers Grimm and seven other children, including Ludwig Emil Grimm and Charlotte Amalie Grimm. He was husband of Dorothea Grimm.

Brothers Grimm
18th-century German lawyers
1796 deaths
Year of birth unknown